Šibice is a naselje (settlement) in the town of Zaprešić, Zagreb County, Croatia.

References 

Populated places in Zagreb County
Zaprešić